Haynan Creek is a  long 1st order tributary to Cross Creek in Washington County, Pennsylvania. This is the only stream of this name in the United States.

Course
Haynan Creek rises about 1 mile west-northwest of West Middletown, Pennsylvania, in Washington County and then flows north to join Cross Creek about 1 mile southeast of Avella.

Watershed
Haynan Creek drains  of area, receives about 40.1 in/year of precipitation, has a wetness index of 317.57, and is about 66% forested.

See also
List of Rivers of Pennsylvania

References

Rivers of Pennsylvania
Rivers of Washington County, Pennsylvania